Krušik Holding Corporation is a Serbian state-owned company for the production of defense and civil related equipment, with the headquarters in Valjevo, Serbia.

The company was founded in 1939 in what was then Kingdom of Yugoslavia, for the needs of then Yugoslavia defense industry and army. Today the company represents the Government and military–industrial complex of Serbia in the sphere of production of defense and civil equipment. The company works together with the Serbian Armed Forces, Military Technical Institute, Yugoimport SDPR and many other private companies in Serbia and around the world to produce new weapons and systems. The company also provides weapons design, joint participation in sales and manufacturing technology transfer.

History
In 1939 a company named "Vistad" in Valjevo was founded by engineer Nikola Stanković. It produced  small caliber (12 kg) aircraft bomb, hand offensive grenades, infantry rifle ammunition. During WWII, farm equipment was produced. After WWII factory was nationalized and renamed to Military-Technical Institute of Valjevo. In 1948 the company was registered under the name of “Krušik”.

In 1999, the company's facilities were heavily destroyed during the NATO bombing of Yugoslavia. As of 2009, Krušik held a large contract to arm the Iraqi army.

After two decades of working in limited capacity, in 2010s the company has begun operating positively, having annual revenues of nearly 100 million euros and cooperating with more than 70 countries worldwide. As of 2019, it has around 3,200 employees and is one of the main companies of defense industry of Serbia. In February 2019, the company celebrated its 80-year anniversary.

Controversies
In September 2019, it became public that weapons manufactured by Krušik sold to US Federal contractor Alliant Techsystems ended up in the hands of ISIS fighters in Yemen. This revelation led to the arrest of whistleblower Aleksandar Obradović, an IT worker at Krušik, on suspicion of revealing company secrets. The news of Obradović's arrest had not been made public until one month later, when he was placed under house arrest. On 21 November 2019, the Council of Europe alerted that the whistleblower Aleksandar Obradović is under house arrest.

On November 21, 2019, it was reported that pro-Russian separatists had found an unexploded Serbian mortar bomb in eastern Ukraine. The shells had been traded by Serbian, Cypriot, and Polish companies, and were not authorized by Serbia for export to Ukraine. On 13 March 2022, the Ukrainian defense ministry posted a YouTube video which shows Ukrainian soldiers firing 60mm mortar shells (M73) produced by Krušik in 2018.

On March 3, 2023, Serbia denied allegations of providing Ukraine with arms, following media reports by the Russian online newspaper Mash that they delivered 3,500 Grad G-2000 rockets manufactured by Krušik via Turkey and then Slovakia.

Subsidiaries
 RJ-6 "Fabrika akumulatora" - Battery factory founded in 1957. most notably product is battery for MiG-29 airplane and other uses.
 "Krušik-IRC - Istraživačko razvojni centar" founded in 2007 for purpose of development and research in electrical engineering, mechanical engineering and communications technologies.

Products
 Bumbar, anti-tank missile system
 9M14 Malyutka, anti-tank missile system (license)
 9K32 Strela-2, surface-to-air missile system (MANPAD)
 Unguided rockets for multiple rocket launchers (M-77 Oganj, M-63 Plamen, M-87 Orkan, LRSVM Morava)
 Mortar shells for 60mm 81/82mm and 120mm mortars
 Air bombs
 Artillery shells, fuses and gun primers
 Hand grenades
 Anti tank mines
 Anti hail rockets

Incidents
On 13 December 2013, three employees were hurt during testing of the engine and initial filling of the anti-bumper projectile. On 6 November 2014, one employee died of injuries he got after the incident on production line.

On 15 May 2015, seven employees were hurt when capsule of hand grenade exploded on the production line.

See also
 Defense industry of Serbia

References 

Government-owned companies of Serbia
Companies based in Valjevo
1939 establishments in Yugoslavia
Defense industry of Serbia
Defense companies of Serbia
Serbian brands